Udeopsylla is a genus of camel crickets in the family Rhaphidophoridae. There is one described species in Udeopsylla, U. robusta.

References

Further reading

 

Rhaphidophoridae
Articles created by Qbugbot